Miss Chinese International Pageant 1999 was held on February 14, 1999 in Hong Kong. The pageant was organized and broadcast by TVB in Hong Kong.  Miss Chinese International 1998 Louisa Luk of San Francisco, USA crowned her Michelle Ye of New York City, USA as the 11th Miss Chinese International. The victory marked the first back to back winners for the United States.

Pageant information
The theme to this year's pageant is "Showcasing Oriental Charm, Displaying Glamour of the Century." 「展現東方魅力  發放世紀風情」.  The Masters of Ceremonies were Carol Cheng, Cutie Mui, Louis Yuen, Cheung Tat-Ming, and Jerry Lamb.  Special performing guests were TVB actors Nick Cheung and Mariane Chan.

Results

Special awards
Miss Friendship: Mabel Wong 黃淑儀 (Calgary)
Miss Classic Beauty: Michelle Ye 葉璇 (New York)

Contestant list

Contestant notes
-Michelle Ye was originally 2nd runner up at New York's regional pageant. She went on to compete in Hong Kong after the winner resigned, and the 1st runner up declined the title.

-Anne Heung later represented Hong Kong and competed at Miss Universe 1999. She was unplaced, but placed 7th overall in the online Miss Photogenic polls.

Crossovers
Contestants who previously competed or will be competing at other international beauty pageants:

Miss Universe
 1999: : Anne Heung

External links
Johnny's Pageant Page - Miss Chinese International Pageant 1999

TVB
1999 beauty pageants
1999 in Hong Kong
Beauty pageants in Hong Kong
Miss Chinese International Pageants